Philippe Gaumond (born 8 August 1988) is a Canadian male badminton player. In 2013, he competed at the Summer Universiade in Kazan, Russia. In 2016, he won the gold medal in mixed team event at the Pan Am Badminton Championships. In the individual event, he won the silver medal in men's doubles event partnered with Maxime Marin.

Achievements

Pan Am Championships
Men's Doubles

References

External links 
 
 

Living people
1988 births
Canadian male badminton players
Sportspeople from Saint-Hyacinthe